We Are Brothers is a 2014 South Korean comedy-drama film directed by Jang Jin.

Plot
Two brothers were separated in childhood at an orphanage, only to find each other as adults 30 years later. But right after their reunion, their birth mother, who suffers from Alzheimer's disease, suddenly disappears. So Sang-yeon (a pastor raised in America) and Ha-yeon (a shaman) team up together and go on a road trip to search for her.

Cast

Cho Jin-woong as Park Sang-yeon 
Kim Sung-kyun as Park Ha-yeon 
Kim Young-ae as Seung-ja
Yoon Jin-yi as Yeo-il
Lee Hae-yeong as Eldest son of Kim Man-jae
Jung Min-jin as Second son of Kim Man-jae
Jo Bok-rae as Pickpocker's older brother
Choi Tae-won as Pickpocket's younger brother
Im Gi-hong as MacArthur 
Kim Jin-kyu as Assistant director 
Lee Cheol-min as PD
Jo Seon-mook as General manager 
Kwon Oh-soo as CP head of department 
Cha Eun-jae as Writer Kim 
Lee Han-wi as Security guard (cameo)
Kim Byeong-ok as Homeless Mr. Kim (cameo)
Go Eun-mi as young Seung-ja (cameo)
Kim Min-kyo as Towing man (cameo)
Kim Kyeong-ae as Jeong-rye (cameo)
Miles Meili as adoptive father
Wendy Taylor as adoptive mother

References

External links

South Korean comedy-drama films
2014 comedy-drama films
2014 films
Showbox films
Films about brothers
2010s South Korean films